Niavol (also Romanized as Nīāvol, Neyavol, Niaval, and Niya Vel; also known as Nīāvalā and Niāwala) is a village in Deylaman Rural District, Deylaman District, Siahkal County, Gilan Province, Iran. At the 2006 census, its population was 92, in 32 families.

References 

Populated places in Siahkal County